The Broken Giant is a 1997 American drama film written and directed by Estep Nagy, and stars John Glover, Brooke Smith and Will Arnett. It is meditative in style, with long silences and highly composed photography, released in 1997 and was acquired by the permanent collection of the Museum of Modern Art in 2000. The soundtrack was released as Songs Put Together For (The Broken Giant) by Will Oldham.

Plot
A young minister in a small town gives sanctuary at his church to a girl who mysteriously arrives out of breath and apparently running from something, or somebody.

External links

1997 films
1997 drama films
American drama films
1997 independent films
American independent films
1990s English-language films
1990s American films